Colin Davidson (born 21 July 1969) is a Canadian former cyclist. He competed in the team time trial at the 1992 Summer Olympics.

References

External links
 

1969 births
Living people
Canadian male cyclists
Olympic cyclists of Canada
Cyclists at the 1992 Summer Olympics
Sportspeople from Vancouver